Gliese 436 b  (sometimes called GJ 436 b)  is a Neptune-sized exoplanet orbiting the red dwarf Gliese 436. It was the first hot Neptune discovered with certainty (in 2007) and was among the smallest-known transiting planets in mass and radius, until the much smaller Kepler exoplanet discoveries began circa 2010.

In December 2013, NASA reported that clouds may have been detected in the atmosphere of GJ 436 b.

In August 2022, this planet and its host star were included among 20 systems to be named by the third NameExoWorlds project.

Discovery
Gliese 436 b was discovered in August 2004 by R. Paul Butler and Geoffrey Marcy of the Carnegie Institute of Washington and University of California, Berkeley, respectively, using the radial velocity method. Together with 55 Cancri e, it was the first of a new class of planets with a minimum mass (M sini) different to Neptune.

The planet was recorded to transit its star by an automatic process at NMSU on January 11, 2005, but this event went unheeded at the time. In 2007, Michael Gillon from  Geneva University in Switzerland led a team that observed the transit, grazing the stellar disc relative to Earth. Transit observations led to the determination of its exact mass and radius, both of which are very similar to that of Neptune, making Gliese 436 b at that time the smallest known transiting extrasolar planet. The planet is about four thousand kilometers larger in diameter than Uranus and five thousand kilometers larger than Neptune and slightly more massive. Gliese 436b orbits at a distance of four million kilometers or one-fifteenth the average distance of Mercury from the Sun.

Physical characteristics

The planet's surface temperature is estimated from measurements taken as it passes behind the star to be . This temperature is significantly higher than would be expected if the planet were only heated by radiation from its star, which was prior to this measurement, estimated at 520 K. Whatever energy tidal effects deliver to the planet, it does not affect its temperature significantly. A greenhouse effect would result in a much greater temperature than the predicted 520–620 K.

In 2019, USA Today reported that the exoplanet's burning ice continued to have scientists "flabbergasted." Its main constituent was initially predicted to be hot "ice" in various exotic high-pressure forms, which would remain solid despite the high temperatures, because of the planet's gravity. The planet could have formed further from its current position, as a gas giant, and migrated inwards with the other gas giants. As it approached its present position, radiation from the star would have blown off the planet's hydrogen layer via coronal mass ejection. 

However, when the radius became better known, ice alone was not enough to account for the observed size. An outer layer of hydrogen and helium, accounting for up to ten percent of the mass, was be needed on top of the ice to account for the observed planetary radius. This obviates the need for an ice core. Alternatively, the planet may consist of a dense rocky core surrounded by a lesser amount of hydrogen. 

Observations of the planet's brightness temperature with the Spitzer Space Telescope suggest a possible thermochemical disequilibrium in the atmosphere of this exoplanet. Results published in Nature suggest that Gliese 436b's dayside atmosphere is abundant in CO and deficient in methane (CH4) by a factor of ~7,000.  This result is unexpected because, based on current models at its temperature, atmospheric carbon should prefer CH4 over CO. In part for this reason, it has also been hypothesized to be a possible helium planet.

Orbital characteristics
One orbit around the star takes only about two days, 15.5 hours. Gliese 436 b's orbit is likely misaligned with its star's rotation. The eccentricity of Gliese 436 b's orbit is inconsistent with models of planetary system evolution. To have maintained its eccentricity over time requires that it be accompanied by another planet.

A study published in Nature found that the orbit of Gliese 436 b is nearly perpendicular (inclined by  103.2 degrees) to the stellar equator of Gliese 436 and suggests that the eccentricity and misalignment of the orbit could have resulted from interactions with a yet undetected companion.  The inward migration caused by this interaction could have triggered the atmospheric escape that sustains its giant exosphere.

See also
55 Cancri e
Gliese 581 b
Gliese 876 d
HAT-P-11b

References

Selected media articles

 How Do Artists Portray Exoplanets They've Never Seen? 4/9, Scientific American October 2, 2007.
 Astronomers Detect Shadow Of Water World In Front Of Nearby Star (from Science Daily).

External links

Leo (constellation)
Transiting exoplanets
Giant planets
Exoplanets discovered in 2004
Exoplanets detected by radial velocity
Hot Neptunes
4